Lineolariidae is a family of cnidarians belonging to the order Leptomedusae.

Genera:
 Agglutinaria Antsulevich, 1987
 Lineolaria Hincks, 1861
 Nicoliana Watson, 1992

References

 
Leptothecata
Cnidarian families